Bahar Pars (Persian: بهار پارس) (born 28 March 1979) is an Iranian-Swedish actress and director.

Early life
Pars was born in Shiraz, Iran, and came to Trelleborg, Sweden in 1989 with her family after the war between Iran and Iraq. Between 2003 and 2007 she studied to become an actress at Teaterhögskolan in Stockholm (nowadays Stockholms dramatiska högskola).

Career
Pars has had several roles in plays and also several films. She made her film debut in the 2006 film När mörkret fallet. In 2008 she performed the role of Nina in Farnaz Arbabis Måsen at Backateatern. At Uppsala stadsteater Pars played the title roles in the plays Anna Karenina in 2010, the stage version of Låt den rätta komma in 2011, and Hedda Gabler in 2013, the later directed by Farnaz Arbabi.

In 2014, Pars acted in the Jonas Hassen Khemiris play Jag ringer mina bröder as the character Valerie, directed by Farnaz Arbabi at Kulturhuset Stadsteatern. In November the same year she performed the monologue play På alla fyra at Kilenscenen at Kulturhuset Stadsteatern. The newspaper Svenska Dagbladet reviewed Pars' performance favourably and described it as "she had total control of her ways of expressions". Outside of acting, Pars has also directed and been one of the creators Nyårsklockan, in which fifteen female culture-personalities appear.

In 2015, she was awarded the Medea Award with the citation "In her own personal way Bahar Pars widens the ways to play classical female roles and bring them into our present time". She had the leading role as Bertha in the play Marodörer, written and directed by Jens Ohlin at Dramaten in 2015.

Ahead of the 2016 Guldbaggen awards she was nominated in the category Best Supporting Actress for her role as Parvaneh in the 2015 film A Man Called Ove.

Personal life 
Pars married Linus Tunström and the couple has a daughter born in 2011.

Television 
2008 Åkalla
2008 Kungamordet
2010 Drottningoffret
2014 Den fjärde mannen
2015 Arne Dahl: En midsommarnattsdröm
2016 Finaste familjen
2016 Vårdgården

Filmography 
2006 When Darkness Falls
2009 Knäcka
2010 Kommissarie Winter
2010 Fredlösa
2010 Händelse vid bank
2015  A Man Called Ove
2016 Zon 261
2022 Maya Nilo (Laura)

References

External links 

Agentfirman Planthaber Kilden Mandic
Expressen intervju med Bahar Pars (Swedish)
SituationSTHLM intervju med Bahar Pars (Swedish)
Guldbaggen nominering - Bahar Pars (Swedish)

Living people
1979 births
21st-century Swedish actresses
Iranian emigrants to Sweden
People from Shiraz
Refugees in Sweden
Iranian refugees
Swedish film actresses
Swedish television actresses
Swedish women film directors